is a municipality in Trøndelag county, Norway. It is part of the Dovre region and the traditional district of Orkdalen. The administrative centre of the municipality is the village of Oppdal. Other villages in the municipality include Lønset, Vognillan, Fagerhaug, and Holan. The Oppdal Airport, Fagerhaug is located in the northeastern part of the municipality.

The  municipality is the 24th largest by area out of the 356 municipalities in Norway. Oppdal is the 139th most populous municipality in Norway with a population of 7,066.

General information

The prestegjeld of Oppdal was established as a municipality on 1 January 1838 (see formannskapsdistrikt law). The municipal boundaries have not changed since that time.  On 1 January 2018, the municipality switched from the old Sør-Trøndelag county to the new Trøndelag county.

Name
The municipality (originally the parish) is named after the old Oppdal farm since the first Oppdal Church was built there. Historically, the name was also spelled Opdal.

Coat of arms
The coat of arms was granted on 19 February 1982 (they were re-approved on 13 May 1983 after the government slightly changed the wording of the blazon). The official blazon is "Azure, three piles argent conjoined in pall". This means the arms have a blue field (background) and the charge is three triangles that meet in the centre, forming a Y-shaped design. The triangle design has a tincture of argent which means it is commonly colored white, but if it is made out of metal, then silver is used. The design was nicknamed "meeting of ways" representing three important roads that meet in Oppdal, making it a major centre of commerce and transportation. One road comes from Dombås in the south going over the Dovre Mountains, one road comes from Sunndalsøra in Nordmøre from west, and the third road comes from Trondheim in the north(east). Historically, this area was a gathering place due to its central location. The arms were designed by Einar H. Skjervold. The municipal flag has the same design as the coat of arms.

Churches
The Church of Norway has three parishes within the municipality of Oppdal. It is part of the Gauldal prosti (deanery) in the Diocese of Nidaros.

History

Oppdal is an alpine community which dates back to the Norwegian Iron Age. It is located at a crossroads for traffic from Trondheim, the Dovrefjell mountain range, and Sunndal on the west coast. This is reflected in the three rays in the coat-of-arms.

Oppdal was first settled sometime before 600 CE. By then there were about 50 farms in the area, and this number grew by about 20 more in the Viking Era. There are remnants of over 700 Pagan grave mounds from the time at Vang, in which jewelry and other pieces from the British Isles were found. This indicates that the area was relatively affluent and participated in the Viking trade. Much of the affluence was likely derived from the availability of game, both in the area and from nearby mountain ranges. Several game traps can still be seen in mountains around Oppdal, particularly ditches for reindeer. There have been more than 80 finds of at least two different types of arrowheads in the area.

Archeological finds in Oppdal indicate that there were less pronounced economic disparities than elsewhere in Norway. Communal efforts to hold off famine and share burdens appear to have been common throughout several centuries.

During the Christian era, Pagan shrines and grave mounds were replaced by churches and chapels. Five rural churches were built in Oppdal at the time, in Vang, Ålbu, Lønset, Lo, and Nordskogen. The Oppdal Church, built to replace an earlier stave church in 1653, stands to this day.

Oppdal was a stop for pilgrims on their way to the St. Olav shrine at the Nidaros Cathedral in Trondheim during the Middle Ages. As a result of the heavy stream of pilgrims who followed the Pilgrim's Route prior to the Reformation, King Eystein erected mountain stations where the pilgrims could find food and shelter. Kongsvoll, located on the Driva River along the route where pilgrims passed from the Gudbrandsdal valley into Oppdal was one of these stations, and is still an inn today. Drivstua, further north, was another.

Oppdal was particularly affected by the Black Plague, which led to the abandonment of a number of farms. With a worsening of the climate, the community hadn't recovered 170 years later, and there were only 35 farms and 350 people left. Only one church at Vang was still in use. As late as 1742, people in Oppdal died of hunger.

In the early 17th century, Oppdal's fortunes turned and population grew. By 1665, 2,200 people lived in Oppdal, and a new church was built at Vang, the Oppdal Church, which stands to this day. The Lønset Chapel and Fagerhaug Chapel have been re-established, and Oppdal houses several other religious communities. Since the 18th century, the inhabitants of Oppdal have made significant investments in education, leading to the establishment of several small rural schools and, recently, a high school.

In the 19th century, increased fertility and reduced mortality led to population growth that could not be sustained by agricultural resources. Many became tenant farmers, and eventually a large proportion of people from Oppdal emigrated to the United States. The population decreased until 1910, when the railroad from Oslo to Trondheim via Dovre (the Dovre Line) created employment and opened the area for tourism. In 1952, the first ski lift opened, and with further expansions Oppdal now offers one of Norway's largest downhill networks.

In 2013, NRK said that a Labour Party politician was fighting against the establishment of a refugee center.

Government
All municipalities in Norway, including Oppdal, are responsible for primary education (through 10th grade), outpatient health services, senior citizen services, unemployment and other social services, zoning, economic development, and municipal roads. The municipality is governed by a municipal council of elected representatives, which in turn elect a mayor. The municipality falls under the Trøndelag District Court and the Frostating Court of Appeal.

Municipal council
The municipal council of Oppdal is made up of 25 representatives that are elected to four year terms. The party breakdown of the council is as follows:

Mayor
The mayors of Oppdal:

1837–1841: Ingebrigt Haldorsen Sæter
1842–1845: Peder Sæther
1846–1847: John Furunes
1848–1871: Ingebrigt Haldorsen Sæter
1872–1875: Peder Sæther
1876–1879: Ingebrigt Vigen
1880–1889: Mons Bjørlo (V)
1890–1895: Iver Ørsta (V)
1896–1904: Ole P. Haugseth (V)
1905–1907: Iver Ørsta (V)
1908–1916: Ole P. Haugseth (V)
1917–1919: John Engelsjord (V)
1920–1922: Engel Meslo (V)
1923–1925: Sivert H. Sæther (Bp)
1926–1928: Esten K. Gorseth (Bp)
1929–1931: Ole Olsen Stuen (Bp)
1932–1937: Peder O. Haugseth (Bp)
1938–1940: Esten K. Gorseth (Bp)
1941-1941: Håkon S. Wognild (NS)
1941–1945: Georg K. Aalbu (NS)
1945-1945: Esten K. Gorseth (Bp)
1946–1947: Ole I. Aalbu (V)
1948–1951: Leif Skorem (Bp)
1952–1959: Knut H. Dørum (Bp)
1960–1965: Hallvard Bjørndal (Sp)
1966–1967: Ola P. Hoel (Sp)
1968–1971: Ola Erik Stugu (Sp)
1972–1975: Ola P. Hoel (Sp)
1976–1979: Erik A. Nerhoel (Sp)
1980–1983: Ola P. Hoel (Sp)
1984–1985: Per Asphaug (H)
1986–1987: Hans Rogstad (KrF)
1988-1992: Ola Røtvei (Ap)
1992-1993: Ola Arne Aune (Sp)
1994-2003: John Egil Holden (Sp)
2003-2015: Ola Røtvei (Ap)
2015-2019: Kirsti Welander (Ap)
2019–present: Geir Arild Espnes (Sp)

Geography

Oppdal is bordered by two municipalities in Trøndelag county (Rennebu to the northeast and Rindal to the west), two municipalities in Møre og Romsdal county (Surnadal to the north and Sunndal to the west), two municipalities in Hedmark county (Tynset to the east and Folldal to the south), and one municipality in Oppland county (Dovre to the south).

European route E6 passes straight through the commercial center of Oppdal going north and south, and Norwegian National Road 70 connects Oppdal to Kristiansund in the west.

The southeastern part of Trollheimen mountain range is located in the municipality. The municipality covers an area equal to the entire county of Vestfold. In 2001, its drinking water was named the best in Norway.

Most of Oppdal's area is mountainous, with large areas above the treeline. Other mountains include Blåhøa and Allmannberget. The Speilsalen tunnel was a glacial formation near Blåhøa.

In the valleys there are creeks and rivers which are surrounded by spruce and pine woods; closer to the treeline, birches dominate. There are several lakes in the municipality, the most famous being Gjevilvatnet, a particularly scenic lake with hiking and cross-country skiing trails around it. The lake Fundin is located in the southern part of the municipality.

Heather and alpine meadows provide grazing for sheep in the summer. About  of the mountains has been held since time immemorial as a collective (almenning) by farmers in the area, giving them the right to hunt, fish, and rent cabins.

Climate
Oppdal has a boreal climate, with spring as the driest season and summer as the wettest season. The climate is slightly continental with an average annual precipitation of only . The all-time high  was recorded 26 July 2019. The all-time low  is from February 2010. The weather station at Oppdal-Sæther started recording December 1999. The earlier weather station Oppdal-Bjørke recorded from 1975 to August 1992. Data for precipitation days is from Oppdal-Mjøen, which averaged just  annually in 1961–1990.

Snakes have never made it to Oppdal, and snowy weather is not that unusual on the 17 May National Day celebrations.

Economy
The main industries in Oppdal today are agriculture, tourism, and some light manufacturing. It has the largest sheep population of any municipality in Norway, with 45,000 head of sheep put out to graze in the mountains every year. It is one of Norway's best ski resorts and is surrounded by national parks. A slate quarry exists.

Notable people

 Inge Krokann (1893 in Oppdal – 1962) a writer, his use of the Oppdal dialect makes the area central to his work
 Olav Dalgard(1898–1980) an art historian, filmmaker, author and educator, raised at Oppdal 
 Einar Ingvald Haugen (1906–1994) was a Norwegian-American linguist, author and professor at University of Wisconsin–Madison; he was born in Sioux City, Iowa, to Norwegians from Oppdal.
 Sivert Donali (1931 in Oppdal – 2010) a Norwegian sculptor
 Harald Sæther (born 1946 in Oppdal) a Norwegian composer, lives in Oppdal
 Kåre Jostein Simonsen (born 1948 in Oppdal) a Norwegian bandoneon player
 Sjur Loen (born 1958 in Oppdal) a curler, multiple world champion medallist
 Ingebrigt Håker Flaten (born 1971 in Oppdal) a bassist active in the jazz and free jazz genres
 Bård Bjorndalseter, a local woodcarver lives and works in Oppdal
 Twins Silje Øyre Slind & Astrid Øyre Slind (born 1988 in Oppdal) Norwegian cross-country skiers
 Markus Høiberg (born 1991 in Oppdal) a curler, competed at the 2014 Winter Olympics

References

External links

 Municipal fact sheet from Statistics Norway 
 Oppdal travel guide from Visit Oppdal 
 Oppdal weather and snow report 

 
Municipalities of Trøndelag
Ski areas and resorts in Norway
1838 establishments in Norway